Manfred Metzger (26 May 1905 – February 1986) was a Swiss competitive sailor and Olympic medalist. He won a bronze medal in the 5.5 Metre class at the 1960 Summer Olympics in Rome, together with Henri Copponex and Pierre Girard.

References

External links

 

1905 births
1986 deaths
Swiss male sailors (sport)
Sailors at the 1960 Summer Olympics – 5.5 Metre
Olympic sailors of Switzerland
Olympic bronze medalists for Switzerland
Olympic medalists in sailing
Medalists at the 1960 Summer Olympics
20th-century Swiss people